Club Olympique de Kélibia, known as COK, is a Tunisian volleyball club founded in 1957 and formalized on March 10, 1959.

History 
It begins to shine from the 1959-1960 season during which It reaches the semi-finals of the Tunisian men's volleyball cup and wins the division 3 championship with a formation including Savior Mazzara, Abdelkader Ben Nasr, Hamadi Ben Sheikh, Mahmoud Ben Sheikh and Hamouda Ben Messaoud. In 1963-1964, It was second in the play-offs and entered division 1.

Club based primarily on volleyball, wholly owns 16 categories (men and women) and has 452 licensees (boys and girls), 10% of the number of Tunisian national teams.

Honours 
 Men (Senior):

 Women (Senior) :

Human Resources

Steering Committee 
 President: Aida Lengliz
 Vice president: Riadh Ben Cheikh
 Vice president: Med Ben Hamed
 Secretary-General: Sinen Ben Rejeb
 Treasurer: Moez Ben Youssef

Technical staff 
 Technical Director: Lotfi Ben Slimane
 Senior coach men: Med Ali Ben Cheikh
 Deputy: Hatem Sammoud
 Coach ladies Seniors: Lassad Mahfoudh
 Deputy: Seif Ksila

References

External links
 Official Website

Tunisian volleyball clubs
1957 establishments in Tunisia
Sports clubs in Tunisia
Volleyball clubs established in 1957